Felix Eugenio Mkhori (August 24, 1931 – October 27, 2012) was the bishop of the Roman Catholic Diocese of Lilongwe, Malawi.

Ordained to the priesthood in 1961, he was named a bishop in 1977. He was Bishop of Chikwawa from 1979 until 2001, when he was appointed Bishop of Lilongwe. 

He retired in 2007 and died in 2012.

Notes

21st-century Roman Catholic bishops in Malawi
1931 births
2012 deaths
20th-century Roman Catholic bishops in Malawi
Roman Catholic bishops of Chikwawa
Roman Catholic bishops of Lilongwe
Malawian clergy